Danshina is a rural locality (a village) in Yorgvinskoye Rural Settlement, Kudymkarsky District, Perm Krai, Russia. The population was 11 as of 2010.

Geography 
Danshina is located 20 km north of Kudymkar (the district's administrative centre) by road. Osipova is the nearest rural locality.

References 

Rural localities in Kudymkarsky District